Bouxwiller is the name of the following communes in France:

 Bouxwiller, Bas-Rhin, in the Bas-Rhin department
 Bouxwiller, Haut-Rhin, in the Haut-Rhin department